Flor (stylized as flor) (previously Sunderland) is an American indie band formed in Hood River, Oregon in 2014. The band currently consists of Zach Grace (lead vocals, guitar, keyboards), Dylan Bauld (bass), and Kyle Hill (drums).

History

The band got its start in Hood River, Oregon, when Zach Grace began experimenting with electronic music-making programs. After moving to Los Angeles, Flor connected with photographer/designer Jade Ehlers, who helped the band come up with distinctive visuals. Meanwhile, Bauld established himself as a producer working with Flor, as well as artists like Halsey, Lights, Smallpools, and Lostboycrow. The band released their debut single, "heart", online in 2014, with the Sounds EP arriving that October. Following the release of the 2015 full-length Sights & Sounds, Flor signed to Fueled by Ramen in 2016, which reissued the Sounds EP that February.

Their debut album, come out. you’re hiding was released on May 19, 2017. The album title was teased in a tweet on March 23 before being confirmed in another tweet the next day. The album’s lead single, "guarded", was released the same day.

On March 8, 2019, Flor released the single "slow motion". On July 10, they announced their second studio album, ley lines. It came out on September 6, 2019, and includes twelve songs. When asked about the inspiration behind the album, lead singer Grace said, "There's a theory that important places of power like Stonehenge or the Pyramids of Giza are connected by invisible lines. As a parallel, I needed to find my own anchor points for belief and purpose. I realized you can build those roads yourself. Friends, family, and the band are my anchors. The music comes out of the 'ley lines'". On November 11, 2019, they announced their first North American tour.

In early 2020, the band launched the EP reimagined, new versions of four of their hit songs and a cover song. It was released in two parts: reimagined pt. 1, consisting of "warm blood", "slow motion", and a cover of Coldplay's "yellow", which featured Misterwives, in February; and reimagined pt. 2, consisting of "white noise" and "unsaid", in July.

On August 19, they released the standalone single "lmho", which was originally written around the time they completed their debut album. Grace described the song as his way of "spilling my sadness, confusion, and heartache into [...] music". As a substitution for their lack of touring due to the COVID-19 pandemic, the band premiered a live at-home performance exclusively on their YouTube channel in December 2020.

On December 1, 2021, they debuted the single "have yourself a merry little christmas", a cover of the song of the same title. This was the only material the band released in 2021.

On February 17, 2022, Flor premiered "Play Along" as the lead single from their anticipated third studio album, Future Shine. The new album was announced on March 23, alongside the release of the singles "Skate" and "Big Shot". It was released on May 6, 2022. In support of the album, they performed three shows entitled "flor in Twenty-Four", where they toured New York City, Los Angeles, and their hometown of Hood River in only twenty-four hours. The shows were then followed by a North American headline tour in September and October 2022.

On September 2, 2022, the band released the single "Every Night". It serves as an additional track to the DSP version of their latest album.

On February 24, 2023, Kitts announced his departure from the band to raise his family, making Flor a trio.

Band members
Current
 Zach Grace – lead vocals, guitar, keyboards (2014–present)
 Dylan Bauld – bass guitar, backing vocals, production (2014–present)
 Kyle Hill – drums, percussion (2014–present)

Past
 McKinley Kitts – guitar, backing vocals (2014–2023)

Touring
 Val Hoyt – guitar, backing vocals (2022–present)

Discography

Studio albums

EPs

Singles

Notes

References

External links

 

Rock music groups from Oregon
Musical groups established in 2014
2014 establishments in Oregon
Musical trios
Fueled by Ramen artists